David C. White is an American writer and producer, best known for writing the 2015 History Channel miniseries Sons of Liberty.

Early life and education

White was educated at Oyster River High School in Durham, New Hampshire, graduating in 2000. He went on to attend the University of New Hampshire, also in Durham, where he majored in Communications with a minor in English, graduating in 2005.

Career

In 2012, White wrote and produced the History Channel docudrama miniseries The Men Who Built America, for which he was nominated for two Primetime Emmys. The following year, he wrote and produced a follow-up History Channel docudrama series, The World Wars, which led to another pair of Emmy nominations.

In 2014, White co-wrote the scripted miniseries Sons of Liberty, which premiered on January 25, 2015. In December 2015, he was nominated for a Writers Guild of America Award for his work on the show.

Filmography

Television

Awards and nominations

References

External links 
 

American television writers
American male television writers
Year of birth missing (living people)
Living people